Birth Story: Ina May Gaskin and the Farm Midwives is a 2012 documentary film about midwife Ina May Gaskin of The Farm in Tennessee, directed by Sara Lamm and Mary Wigmore.

References

External links

Film's official website
Nora Lee Mandel review at Film-Forward (January 30, 2013)
Interview with Director Sara Lamm

2012 films
American documentary films
2012 documentary films
Works about midwifery
Documentary films about activists
2010s English-language films
2010s American films